Rise to Fall is a Spanish heavy metal band from Bilbao. Their music is strongly influenced by the Swedish melodic death metal scene. The band was formed in 2006 and they started recording an album in 2008. They released their first studio album Restore The Balance in 2010 under the label Coroner Records. During the same year they performed in the festival Bilbao BBK Live 2010. 

The band performed in many pubs and festivals in Spain and other countries with bands like  Rammstein, Slayer, Bullet for my Valentine, Amon Amarth, Scar Symmetry, The Agonist, Dagoba, Textures etc.
In 2011, they toured in Japan between the cities Nagoya, Osaka and Tokyo with the Italian band Destrage and the Japanese band Blood Stain Child.
The band released their second album Defying The Gods in 2012.

Members
Dalay Tarda - vocals
Dann Hoyos - lead guitar
Hugo Markaida- guitar
Javi Martín- bass
Xabi “Txamo” - drums

Discography
Restore the Balance (Coroner Records / Nonstop Music Records) - 2010
Defying the Gods  (Coroner Records / Soulfood) - 2012
End VS Beginning (Coroner Records) - 2015
Into Zero - 2018
The Fifth Dimension (Noble Demon) - 2023

Videos
"Redrum - 2010
"Whispers of Hope" - 2012
"The Threshold" - 2015
"End Vs Beginning" - 2017
"Burning Signs" - 2017
"Acid Drops" - 2018
"In the Wrong Hands" - 2018

References

External links
Official website
Myspace page

Spanish melodic death metal musical groups
Spanish alternative metal musical groups
Musical groups established in 2006
Musical quintets